The eleventh and final season of the American television sitcom Murphy Brown follows news anchor Murphy Brown and the cast and crew of the morning news show Murphy in the Morning as they combat the rise of misinformation and fake news from their studio in Washington D.C. The season was produced by Warner Bros. Television and Bend in the Road Productions, with Diane English and Candice Bergen serving as executive producers.

Bergen stars as Murphy Brown and is joined by principal cast members Faith Ford, Joe Regalbuto, and Grant Shaud, who reprised their roles from the previous seasons, with Jake McDorman, Nik Dodani, Adan Rocha, and Tyne Daly joining them. Upon its premiere, the season was met with a mixed response from critics though it did receive awards recognition including a Golden Globe Award for Best Actress – Television Series Musical or Comedy nomination for Bergen.

Cast and characters

Main
 Candice Bergen as Murphy Brown, a famous investigative journalist and news anchor for FYI. Following a brief retirement, Brown returns to television in her own morning news show Murphy in the Morning.
 Faith Ford as Corky Sherwood, a reporter hired by FYI to replace Murphy during her stay at the Betty Ford Clinic. Years later, she joins Murphy in the Morning as a co-host after getting fired from her job on another morning talk show. 
 Joe Regalbuto as Frank Fontana, an investigative reporter on FYI and later Murphy in the Morning.
 Grant Shaud as Miles Silverberg, an executive producer at FYI and later Murphy in the Morning.
 Jake McDorman as Avery Brown, Murphy's son, a journalist and a liberal commentator on the conservative-leaning Wolf Network.
 Nik Dodani as Pat Patel, the director of social media for Murphy in the Morning.
 Adan Rocha as Miguel, a college student working at Phil's Bar in order to make extra money for his school tuition.
 Tyne Daly as Phyllis, the sister of Phil and the current owner of Phil's Bar.

Recurring
 Andre Ward as Julius, the stage manager of Murphy in the Morning.
 Merle Dandridge as Diana Macomber, the head of cable news network CNC, which airs Murphy in the Morning.
 Charles Kimbrough as Jim Dial, the former veteran news anchor for FYI whom Murphy seeks out for advice.

Guest

 Hillary Clinton as Hilary Clendon ("Fake News"), an applicant for the position of Murphy's secretary.
 Ashley Austin Morris as Addie Abrams ("I (Don't) Heart Huckabee"), one of Murphy's secretaries, who arrives to work hung over.
 Harris Yulin as Professor Talbot ("#MurphyToo"), a collegiate journalism professor of Murphy's who sexually harassed her while she was his student.
 Joey Slotnick as Brandon Jensen ("#MurphyToo"), the leader of a sexual harassment seminar for the employees of Murphy in the Morning.
 David Costabile as Ed Shannon ("Three Shirts to the Wind"), a former White House advisor whom Diana wants to have appear on Murphy in the Morning. Murphy is unsure as to whether she should give him a platform or not with Corky and Frank against the idea and Miles tentatively in favor of it.
 Katie Finneran as Christy Shepherd ("The Girl Who Cried About Wolf"), a news anchor at the Wolf Network whom Frank begins dating.
 Peter Gallagher as John Haggerty ("Results May Vary"), a conservative right-wing news anchor at the Wolf Network who hosts The Wolf Pack news show and covers the 2018 midterm elections with Avery.
 Kara Lindsay as Callie Clark ("Results May Vary"), a co-host of the Wolf Network show The Wolf Pack alongside John Haggerty.
 Bette Midler as Caprice Feldman-Morton ("A Lifetime of Achievement"), a former secretary of Murphy's who recently became the largest shareholder of CNC following the death of her husband, Carl Morton.
 John Larroquette as Nate Campbell ("A Lifetime of Achievement"), a federal judge for the D.C. Circuit court who Murphy meets at the Lionel P. Humboldt Lifetime Achievement Award dinner and whom she later has a one-night stand with.
 Katie Couric as herself ("A Lifetime of Achievement"), a journalist and longtime friend of Murphy and Corky. She runs into them while hosting the Lionel P. Humboldt Lifetime Achievement Award dinner.
 Analeigh Tipton as Lauren McCoy ("A Lifetime of Achievement"), an archivist at the Smithsonian and Avery's date to the Lionel P. Humboldt Lifetime Achievement Award dinner.
 Brooke Shields as Holly Mackin Lynne ("The Coma and the Oxford Comma"), a friend of Corky's from her beauty pageant days who awakens from a coma after ten years.
 Stephen Plunkett as Charles Lynne ("The Coma and the Oxford Comma"), Holly's husband who was acquitted of attempted murder while she was in her coma.
 Joanna P. Adler as Mary Kate #97 ("The Coma and the Oxford Comma"), one of Murphy's secretaries who takes grammar very seriously.
 Harrison Chad as Connor ("The Coma and the Oxford Comma"), a friend of Avery's whom he has known since high school.
 Valente Rodriguez as Carlos Gonzales ("Thanksgiving and Taking"), a food truck owner and Miguel's father who entered the United States illegally many years ago. He comes over to Murphy's home for Thanksgiving but is apprehended by ICE and deported.
 Selenis Leyva as Maria Gonzales ("Thanksgiving and Taking"), a food truck owner and Miguel's mother. Along with her husband, she is apprehended by ICE and deported on Thanksgiving.
 Judy Gold as Officer Lynch ("Thanksgiving and Taking"), an ICE agent who apprehends the Gonzales
 Ethan Slater as Officer Reynolds ("Thanksgiving and Taking"), an ICE agent who apprehends the Gonzales
 Bart Shatto as Zac ("Beat the Press"), a Trump supporter from Altoona, Pennsylvania whom Avery interviews shortly before being assaulted
 Peter Scolari as Fred Noonan ("The Wheels on the Dog Go Round and Round"), a health inspector who investigates Phil's bar
 Negin Farsad as Maha Bijan ("The Wheels on the Dog Go Round and Round"), an employee at the 14th Street Animal Shelter who sells Murphy a disabled dog
 Lindsay Mendez as Rachel ("The Wheels on the Dog Go Round and Round"), a producer on Avery's news program who pushes him to read what the network has instructed him to
 Andrea Mitchell as herself ("Happy New Year")
 Lawrence O'Donnell as himself ("Happy New Year")
 Zachary James as Secret Serviceman ("Happy New Year")

Episodes

Production

Development
Following the end of the show's original run, series creator Diane English had been approached multiple times about potentially reviving the series. Around 2008, the show came the closest to being brought back to the air following Sarah Palin's nomination as the Republican vice-presidential nominee with comparisons being drawn between her and former Murphy Brown critic Dan Quayle. In 2017, Warner Bros. Television again approached English about reviving the series following the election of Donald Trump as president. English spent nine months developing an idea for a new iteration of the series before finally composing a script. Candice Bergen was then approached about signing on to the project and she agreed on the condition that Faith Ford, Joe Regalbuto, and Grant Shaud join as well.

On January 24, 2018, it was announced that CBS had given the production a series order for one season consisting of thirteen episodes set to air during the 2018–2019 season. English and Bergen were set to serve as executive producers of the revival which would, according to CBS, be set in "a world of cable news, social media, fake news and a very different political and cultural climate." Production companies involved with the series were slated to consist of Bend in the Road Productions and Warner Bros. Television. On February 27, 2018, it was announced that Pam Fryman would direct the revival's pilot episode.

On May 16, 2018, it was announced during the CBS upfronts presentation that the revival would now have Murphy anchoring a cable morning show, Murphy in the Morning, with her old team, lifestyle reporter Corky Sherwood, investigative journalist Frank Fontana, and producer Miles Silverberg, while Murphy's son Avery would host a rival, cable morning show that airs opposite his mother's program. On July 9, 2018, it was announced that the series would premiere on September 27, 2018. On September 21, 2018, it was reported that CBS had extended the running time of the premiere episode of the revival by five minutes.

On November 28, 2018, it was reported that the season would end after the thirteen episodes ordered by CBS had aired. However, it was further reported that the series was still under consideration by CBS to be renewed for another season. On May 10, 2019, CBS canceled the revival series after a single season.

Casting
Alongside the initial announcement of the revival, it was confirmed that Candice Bergen would reprise her role as Murphy Brown. On February 26, 2018, it was announced that Faith Ford, Joe Regalbuto, and Grant Shaud were joining the main cast and reprising their roles from the series' original run. It was also reported Charles Kimbrough might make a guest appearance in the revival. On March 16, 2018, it was announced that Jake McDorman and Nik Dodani had also joined the main cast. McDorman is set to assume the role of Murphy Brown's now adult son Avery. On April 19, 2018, it was announced that Tyne Daly had joined the main cast in the role of Phyllis, the sister of the deceased bar owner Phil from the series' original run. On August 5, 2018, it was announced during the Television Critics Association's annual summer press tour that Charles Kimbrough would reprise his role from the series' original run in a three episode story arc. On September 13, 2018, it was reported that Adan Rocha had been cast in a series regular role. In October 2018, it was announced that Merle Dandridge had joined the cast in a recurring capacity and that Bette Midler, Brooke Shields, John Larroquette, Katie Couric, and Peter Gallagher would appear in guest starring roles.

Before the premiere of the season, it was reported that the first episode would feature a guest appearance from a prominent individual. The identity of the guest was being kept secret until the episode aired with the network going so far as to not include the scene in which they appeared in screeners for the press. Upon the episode's release, it was revealed that the guest star was in fact former secretary of state and Democratic presidential nominee Hillary Clinton.

Release

Marketing
On April 6, 2018, the first photograph of the cast of the new season was released. On May 16, 2018, the first trailer for the series was released. On August 5, 2018, a promo for the season was released featuring the cast going through the table read of the season premiere. On August 23, 2018, another promo for the series was released featuring Brown and Fontana mocking Donald Trump.

Distribution
In Canada, the season premiered on September 27, 2018, on CityTV. In Australia, it premiered on November 26, 2018, on Network Ten.

Reception

Critical response
The season was met with a mixed response from critics upon its premiere. On the review aggregation website Rotten Tomatoes, the season holds an approval rating of 42% with an average rating of 5.88 out of 10, based on 45 reviews. The website's critical consensus reads, "This just in: while the nostalgia and wit are welcome, Murphy Browns dated messaging tactics feel heavy-handed and smug, leaving this formerly formidably timely series feeling like a reboot reaching for the headlines." Metacritic, which uses a weighted average, assigned the season a score of 53 out of 100 based on 28 critics, indicating "mixed or average reviews".

In a negative review, Varietys Daniel D'Addario was critical of the revival saying, "Murphy Brown 1.0 was a sitcom about what it took to make a good news show — the compromises that go along with that, not all of them journalistic. The supporting characters, once quirky and helpful pals to Murphy, now seem drained: They only pipe up when they have something to say about Trump." In another unfavorable evaluation, Rolling Stones Alan Sepinwall was similarly dismissive of the season giving it two out of five stars and saying, "The revival, again run by Emmy-winning creator Diane English, is conscious that the world has changed in the 20 years since we last saw Murphy and friends. The problem is that Murphy Brown itself really hasn’t, and that does more to tarnish the real show's legacy than anything else."

In a more positive critique, Indiewires Liz Shannon Miller awarded the season a grade of "A−" and praised it saying, "Easily the best aspect of Murphy Brown is how it acknowledges the meta elements of its existence without sacrificing the quality of its comedy or breaking the fourth wall...The writing never forgets just what a trash fire the news can be today, but in unleashing Murphy on the world, there’s the faintest glimpse of hope that maybe, just maybe, change is possible." In an additional favorable assessment, the Los Angeles Times Robert Lloyd said of the season, "It's funny and sweet and true to its roots, if, at times, a little obvious in its aims."

Ratings
While the first episode of the season showed a marked improvement in ratings in its time slot in comparison to the previous year, the series fell short of the ratings of two other recently revived sitcoms from the 1980s and 90s, Roseanne and Will & Grace. Nielsen, the primary provider of television ratings information to the entertainment industry, later reported that the first episode of the season ranked number one among same-gender couples for the first week of the 2018-19 television season.

Awards and nominations

References

External links
 
 

2018 American television seasons
Cultural depictions of Donald Trump